Blackberry Wood is a musical group based in Vancouver, British Columbia, Canada. It consists of guitar, vocals, horn section, marching drum, percussion, and electronics. Depending on the event and their line-up, they will also perform with accordion and fiddle.

History
The band was formed in 2006 as a two-piece, consisting of Kris Wood and Corinne CoCo. In 2007, the group expanded to a three-piece, and by the end of that year had become an eight-piece. In 2013 Blackberry Wood replaced the rhythm section (drums and Bass) with a steampunk instrument they call "The Contraption" and trimmed down to a 4 or 5 piece.

Albums
Blackberry Wood's first album, a self-titled CD, was released in 2007. A remastered version of Travelling Horse Opry, featuring art from Vancouver artist Jordan Bent was released in May 2010. In 2012 the band released the album Strong Man vs Russian Bears. In 2015 a Halloween EP and a Christmas EP were released. In 2017, they released the album Pagan Circus.

Performances
The group plays many festivals and clubs throughout western and northern Canada and the Pacific Northwest of the United States. In 2008, 2009, 2010, 2013 and 2015 Blackberry Wood toured the United Kingdom, including playing at Glastonbury Festival, and other festivals, in 2009, 2010, and 2013.

References

External links 
  Website
  music

Musical groups established in 2006
Musical groups from Vancouver
2006 establishments in British Columbia